The Canadian Sport Parachuting Association (CSPA), through affiliation with the Aero Club of Canada (ACC), is Canada's representative to the Fédération Aéronautique Internationale (FAI) and the International Parachuting Commission (IPC). Thus, the CSPA is the official sport organization for sport parachuting in Canada.

Objectives

The primary objective of the CSPA is to promote safe and enjoyable sport parachuting through cooperation and adherence to self-imposed rules and recommendations. 

Skydivers and skydiving companies that wish to be members of the CSPA must adhere to the established Basic Safety Rules throughout their parachuting career. Such rules include minimum opening altitudes for certain levels of experience, mandatory equipment, clear weather conditions for jumping, reserve repack due dates, general operational requirements, etc. These Basic Safety Rules significantly reduce the risk of accidents for individual skydivers, skydiving companies, and the sport. A Canadian Drop Zone must adhere to all of these safety rules to be a member of the CSPA.

The CSPA has other initiatives to promote overall safety, such as recommended procedures and instructor qualification requirements. A Canadian skydiver starts with a solo license and then progresses to the A, B, C, and D licenses. The CSPA requires that each skydiver keep a log of every jump signed by another jumper and submit that logbook to acquire these qualifications. For example, to get a B License, you have to be able to perform certain manoeuvres and have 50 skydives documented in the submitted logbook. Without this basic proof, skydivers would have no idea how many jumps they have done and could embellish experience levels. This was a major risk earlier but through proper documentation procedures, proof of a skydiver's experience is easily attainable, thereby preventing inexperienced instructors from taking the lead.

The CSPA continually updates all programs and initiatives to adapt to increasing incidents and changes in technology. Every member (skydiver or skydiving company) must implement all changes to remain members.

CanPara

The CSPA publishes CanPara, a bimonthly bilingual publication devoted to informing the Canadian skydiving community of important activities and events in Canadian and worldwide skydiving. CanPara is produced by Annaleah McAvoy and Vic Lefrançois.

Organization

The CSPA comprises Registered Participants and Member Groups. The Board of Directors will consist of no less than three and no more than seven Directors.

National Office Staff:
Executive Director: Michelle Matte-Stotyn
Executive Secretary: Judy Renaud

There are several committees and officers that assist the BoD:

Three Standing Committees:  
Technical & Safety Committee
Coach Working Committee
 Competition & National Teams Committee.

Ad-hoc committees (a sampling):
CanPara - Bi-Monthly, bilingual Magazine
Comp./Dev - Competition Development
GRC - Government Regulatory Committee
IT - Information Technology   
LTAD - Long Term Athlete Development

See also
Parachute
Parachuting
Parachute rigger
Canadian Airborne Forces Association
SkyHawks Parachute Team
United States Parachute Association

References

2006 Parachute Information Manual Part 1. CSPA

External links
Canadian Sport Parachuting Association (CSPA) website
CSPA Coaching Working Committee

Sport Parachuting Association
Parachuting organizations
Parachuting
Fédération Aéronautique Internationale
1956 establishments in Canada